Durarara!! is a Japanese anime television series based on the light novel series of the same name, written by Ryōgo Narita and illustrated by Suzuhito Yasuda. An anime adaption of the light novels was announced in the wraparound sleeve of the sixth volume of the light novel. The anime is produced by Brain's Base and started airing on January 8, 2010, on MBS, TBS, and CBC. The anime was simulcasted for English-speaking audiences within 24 hours of its Japanese premiere. The anime adapted the first three novels, and it was licensed by Beez Entertainment for European release; while at Anime Expo 2010, Aniplex of America confirmed that they have the license to Durarara!!, later producing an English dub for a January 2011 release. The English dub was produced at Bang Zoom! Entertainment. The music for the first season was composed by Makoto Yoshimori, who also wrote the music for Baccano!. The anime began its U.S. broadcast on Cartoon Network's Adult Swim programming block on June 26, 2011, and aired its last episode on December 18, 2011.

On March 15, 2014, a new TV anime series was announced, titled . The main staff from the first series returned, though it was produced at studio Shuka instead of Brain's Base. It aired in three different cours, or quarters of a year. The first cour began in January 2015, the second cour began in July 2015, and the third cour began in January 2016. Crunchyroll simulcasts the series in North America, Central America, South America, Ireland, and the United Kingdom. Aniplex of America licensed the series and is streaming an English dub via Crunchyroll, Funimation and Hulu.

Series overview

Episode list

Season 1 (2010)

Season 2: ×2 (2015–16)

References

External links
 Official Durarara site 

Durarara!!
Durarara!!